The Affectionate Punch is the debut studio album by Scottish post-punk and new wave band The Associates. It was released on 1 August 1980 on the Fiction label.

The song title "Even Dogs in the Wild" became the title of a novel by Scottish mystery writer Ian Rankin, and the song figured briefly in the story.

Release 

The Affectionate Punch was released on 1 August 1980. Michael Dempsey and John Murphy featured in promotional shots and the accompanying tour but did not perform on the record.  Alan Rankine recalls that the whole album was recorded with only himself, Billy Mackenzie and a session drummer: "it was great fun.  We just never stopped and the ideas just came and came and came."

"The Affectionate Punch" and "A" were released as singles to little commercial success.

The cover of the album features Alan Rankine (in the starting position) and Billy Mackenzie (standing) on the running track of Wormwood Scrubs Prison in the White City district of West London.

Critical reception

Upon its release, The Affectionate Punch was declared "a kind of masterpiece" by Paul Morley of the NME, who described it as "a passionate cabaret soul music, a fulfillment of the European white dance music Bowie was flirting with back then."

Retrospective reviews have also been favourable, with BBC Music reviewer Chris Jones writing, "Few bands today would dare to be so audacious".

Remix and reworkings 

The album was remixed and re-released in 1982 by order of The Associates' new record company Warner Bros. The remixed record retained all the old tracks but was given typical '80s production values such as new synthesizers as well as some re-recorded vocals by Billy Mackenzie. Both Mackenzie and Rankine expressed dissatisfaction with the results. For years this was the only version available on CD, as the master tapes for the original had been lost. However, a duplicate was later found and the album was reissued by Virgin in 2005.

The remixed version of "A Matter of Gender" was released as a single in 1982.

In 2019 and 2020 material from the album was performed live in Scotland by Band A with Audrey Redpath on vocals.

Track listing 
All tracks composed by Alan Rankin and Billy Mackenzie

 1982 remixed version

Personnel 
The Associates
 Billy Mackenzie – vocals, design concept
 Alan Rankine – guitar, bass, keyboards, other instruments

Additional personnel
 Robert Smith – backing vocals on "The Affectionate Punch" and "Even Dogs in the Wild"
 Nigel Glockler – drums

Technical
Chris Parry – production
 Mike Hedges – production, engineering
 Mike J. Dutton – engineering assistance
 Graham and Flood – "strong tea" 
 Cliff Lewis, David Baker, Gary Bidmead, Louis Austin, Nigel Mills, Paul Fisher, Phill Brown – re-recording and remixing engineers
 Bill Smith – sleeve artwork

References

External links 
 

1980 debut albums
The Associates (band) albums
Albums produced by Mike Hedges
Albums recorded at Morgan Sound Studios
Fiction Records albums